Sophie Campbell (formerly Ross Campbell) is a comic writer and artist known for her indie comics such as Wet Moon and Shadoweyes, and for her art on the Jem and the Holograms comics. She primarily writes and draws characters who are adolescent or young adult women, including various races, body types, sexual orientations, and abilities.

Career
Campbell is the creator of several graphic novels, including The Abandoned, Mountain Girl, Shadoweyes, Wet Moon, and Water Baby.

She has also done art for comics publishers. In 2008, she drew the story "The Hollows" for the first issue of the DC/Vertigo comic House of Mystery written by Bill Willingham. Beginning in 2012 she drew a run of Image Comics' Glory series written by Joe Keatinge. She drew issues of Teenage Mutant Ninja Turtles for IDW, and in March 2015 she became the artist for their new Jem and the Holograms series written by Kelly Thompson. Her artwork has been praised for affording dignity to all the characters she draws.

From June 2009 to March 2013, then known as Ross Campbell, she was co-host on AudioShocker's "A Podcast with Ross and Nick", followed by "Everything Blows with Ross and Nick". 

In January 2020, Campbell took over as both writer and artist of the mainline IDW TMNT book.

Campbell accepted a deal from Substack in August, 2021 to work on Shadoweyes For Good, the sequel to Shadoweyes. The graphic novel will be available on the site to subscribers.

Personal life 
Campbell is a transgender woman, and began her career under her former name. In March 2015 she publicly announced she had changed her name to Sophie, explaining via Twitter that she had been transitioning for the previous year.

Bibliography
Comics work includes:

Too Much Hopeless Savages! (Oni Press, 2003)
Spooked (with Antony Johnston, graphic novel, Oni Press, 168 pages, February 2004)
Wet Moon (graphic novels, Oni Press, from 2005)
The Abandoned (graphic novel, Tokyopop, 2006)
Raphael: Bad Moon Rising (covers only, Mirage Publishing, 2007)
House of Mystery #1: "The Hollows" (with Bill Willingham, Short story, Vertigo, 2008)
Water Baby (graphic novel, Minx, 2008)
Hack/Slash (contributing artist, Image Comics, 2008–2009)
Resurrection V2 (back-up story, Oni Press, 2010)
Milestone Forever (pin-up, DC Comics, 2010)
Shadoweyes (graphic novel, Slave Labor Graphics, 2010)
Shadoweyes in Love (graphic novel, Slave Labor Graphics, 2011)
Fraggle Rock v2 #2 (with Tim Beedle, comic book, Archaia Studios Press, 2011)
Tales of the Teenage Mutant Ninja Turtles (pin-up, Mirage Publishing, 2006)
Teenage Mutant Ninja Turtles Micro-Series: Leonardo (artist, IDW, 2012)
Glory (artist, #23-34, Image Comics, 2012)
Teenage Mutant Ninja Turtles Villains Micro-Series: Alopex (artist, IDW, 2013)
Teenage Mutant Ninja Turtles (artist, #29-32, IDW, 2013–2014)
Jem and the Holograms (artist; #1-6, 11-16; IDW; 2015)
Batman Black and White #2: "All Cats are Grey" (DC Comics, 2021)

Notes

References

, as well as

External links

The Abandoned review , Comics Bulletin
Audioshocker Podcast

Interviews

American graphic novelists
American webcomic creators
LGBT comics creators
Year of birth missing (living people)
Place of birth missing (living people)
Living people
DC Comics people
Transgender artists
Transgender women
Transgender writers
American LGBT artists
American female comics artists
Female comics writers